Route 157 is a state highway in central Connecticut from northwestern Durham, through Middlefield to Middletown.

Route description
Route 157 begins as Skeet Club Road at an intersection with Route 68 in the northwestern corner of Durham. It heads northeast for about a mile into the town of Middlefield, becoming Redds gap Road and passing by Lyman Orchards. It then turns left onto and begins a  overlap with Route 147 (Main Street) heading north. After leaving the overlap, it continues northeast into Middlefield center following the Coginchaug River. The road continues through the village of Rockfall before entering the city of Middletown. In Middletown, it continues northeast following the Coginchaug using Forest Street, Middlefield Street, and West Street, before ending at an intersection with Route 66 in the Newfield section of Middletown.

History
The route between Middlefield center and Middletown through the village of Rockfall was designated as a primary state highway in 1922, and was known as State Highway 199. In the 1932 state highway renumbering, Route 157 was created from the entire length of old Highway 199 and the southern portion of an old secondary route, Highway 330 (modern Route 147), establishing a route from Durham via Middlefield to Middletown. In 1966, the Durham to Middlefield section was assigned to Route 147. At the same time, Route 157 was extended south along former SR 599 to a newly extended Route 68, resulting in the current routes.

Junction list

References

External links

157
Transportation in Middlesex County, Connecticut